Neil McMillan (born 15 May 1981) is an Irish rugby union flanker.

McMillan was educated at Belfast Royal Academy, and at the age of fifteen was part of the BRA Schools' Cup winning team in 1997. He was selected for Ireland's Under-19, Under-21, Sevens and 'A' teams, spent a year with Leicester Tigers' under-21 team, before signing for Ulster before the 2001–02 season, soon making his debut against Llanelli Scarlets. He won the IRUPA Young Player of the Year award in 2003. 

He played for Ulster for eight years, and was part of the team that won the 2005–06 Celtic League, but was frequently injured, and had major surgery five times. He moved to Harlequins in 2008. He joined Sale Sharks in 2010, leaving at the end of the 2010-11 season.

References

1981 births
Living people
Irish rugby union players
Ulster Rugby players
Ireland Wolfhounds international rugby union players
Harlequin F.C. players
Sale Sharks players
Rugby union flankers